The second season of The Boulet Brothers' Dragula premiered on October 31, 2017, and concluded on January 16, 2018. The competition was broadcast on Amazon Prime in the United States and United Kingdom, OUTtv in Canada, SBS Viceland in Australia and WOW Presents Plus streaming service in worldwide. The series featured 10 contenstants, from all over the United States, competing for the title of World's Next Drag Supermonster and a cash prize of $10,000.

The winner of the second season of The Boulet Brothers' Dragula was Biqtch Puddin', with James Majesty and Victoria Elizabeth Black as the runner-up. Dahli, Kendra Onixxx and Victoria Elizabeth Black returned later to compete in The Boulet Brothers' Dragula: Resurrection, a competition between contestants from previous seasons of Dragula, with the winner returning for the fourth season of Dragula. Saint won the competition and returned for the fourth season as well as runner up Dahli, with Dahli winning the 4th season.

Contestants

Contestant progress
Legend:

Exterminations

Guest judges

Episode summary

References

2017 in LGBT history
2017 television seasons
2018 in LGBT history
2018 television seasons
The Boulet Brothers' Dragula